Statistics of Emperor's Cup in the 1924 season.

Overview
It was contested by 4 teams, and Rijo Club won the championship.

Results

Semifinals
Nagoya Shukyu-dan 1–4 All Mikage Shihan Club
Rijo Club 3–0 Toshima Shukyu-dan

Final

All Mikage Shihan Club 0–1 Rijo Club
Rijo Club won the championship.

References
 NHK

Emperor's Cup
1924 in Japanese football